Saint-Donat is a township municipality in the Canadian province of Quebec, part of the Regional County Municipality of Matawinie, within the larger administrative region of Lanaudière. The main town within the township is also identified as Saint-Donat-de-Montcalm to distinguish it from a parish municipality with the same name in La Mitis RCM. The town is surrounded by mountains and numerous water basins of the Laurentian Mountains. The nearest natural landmark is the Mont-Tremblant National Park.

History
Saint-Donat was founded sometime near 1876 by a religious community of suffragettes as the "Saint-Donat Parish" near the church (located at the intersection of Principale and Allard streets). It was therefore first settled in the mid-to-late 19th century, as a solution to the overcrowding of cities such as Montreal. Over time, the small village received urban population attracted by its beautiful landscape and the town was officially established in 1904. By 1950, Saint-Donat had reached a population of 2,000. As of 2021, the town was nearing 4,600 permanent residents.

Economy
A silica mine is located in Saint-Donat.

Demographics

Population

Private dwellings occupied by usual residents: 2434 (total dwellings: 4527)

Language
All official government actions take place in French, the official language of Quebec. French is the primary language spoken in Saint-Donat, though some people, especially those who deal often with tourists, are able to speak and understand English. 
 Mother tongue:
 English as first language: 2.8%
 French as first language: 94.4%
 English and French as first language: 1.1%
 Other as first language: 1.9%

Government

Saint-Donat forms part of the federal electoral district of Joliette and has been represented by Gabriel Ste-Marie of the Bloc Québécois since 2015. Provincially, Saint-Donat is part of the Bertrand electoral district and is represented by France-Élaine Duranceau of the Coalition Avenir Québec since 2022.

The current mayor of Saint-Donat is Joé Deslauriers. The mayor and a six-member city council are the elected officials of the municipality.

Education

Sainte Agathe Academy (of the Sir Wilfrid Laurier School Board) in Sainte-Agathe-des-Monts serves English-speaking students in this community for both elementary and secondary levels.

Tourism
Saint-Donat is often frequented by tourists in the winter. Its main attraction is snowmobiling, but other winter sports, such as skiing, can be enjoyed there as well, with Ski Garceau and Ski La Reserve being the two most popular resorts in the area. Outdoor skating rinks and cross country ski trails through the forest are frequented by locals and tourists alike. Its mountains, lakes, and pleasant weather attract many tourists in the summer season. Many people who vacation in Saint-Donat during the summer enjoy swimming, kayaking, sailing, and water-skiing on its two large lakes, Lac Archambault and Lac Ouareau. Saint-Donat is the only village in the Laurentiens that has two side-by-side lakes of the size of Archambault and Ouareau. Saint-Donat also contains many other smaller lakes such as Lac Baribeau, Lac Pembina, Lac Croche, and others.

The year-round population of Saint-Donat is approximately 3,700, but during the tourist season, the number of people actually in Saint-Donat can reach 20,000. Saint-Donat has been recognized for its beauty and has received national recognition, especially for the quality of its public places. It was first recognized as a prime tourist destination in 1908, by an engineer with the Ministry of Lands and Forests. Hotels and other businesses necessary in a tourist destination began within a few decades, and tourism was the focal point of the local economy by 1970.

Saint-Donat can be accessed by two main highways, the 125 and 329, and is located 1h30min from Montreal by car. There is also a local airport accessible to light aircraft in the village of Saint-Donat.

Twin towns
Saint-Donat is twinned with:

  Lans-en-Vercors, France, since 1990

See also
 Matawinie Regional County Municipality
 Archambault Lake (Saint-Donat)
 Ouareau Lake
 Saint-Michel River
 Ouareau River
List of municipalities in Quebec

References

Municipalities in Quebec
Incorporated places in Lanaudière
Matawinie Regional County Municipality